Yasemin is a 1988 German-language film directed by Hark Bohm. The international co-production of Turkey and West Germany was chosen as West Germany's official submission to the 61st Academy Awards for Best Foreign Language Film, but didn't obtain a nomination. It was also entered into the 38th Berlin International Film Festival.

Plot
West Germany, 1988. Yasemin and Jan are in the same judo club. Yasemin is a modern young Turkish woman. Jan is an old-fashioned womaniser. When his friends bet he cannot have Yasemin he sees this as a welcome challenge. He plays his best tricks on Yasemin who eventually takes to him because she is led to believe he was no macho but a really modern nice guy. That way she does play his heartstrings. He feels ashamed to have approached her just to impress his friends. Unfortunately this truth is eventually disclosed to her, and when it is, he is dismayed by the harm he has done. However, since this is a classic romantic movie, a happy end is inevitable after all.

Cast
 Ayse Romey as Yasemin
 Uwe Bohm as Jan
 Şener Şen as father Yunuf
 Ilhan Emirli as Dursun
 Sevgi Özdamar as mother Dilber
 Toto Karaca as aunt Zeynep
 Sebnem Selduez as Nesrin
 Nursel Köse as Emine
 Katharina Lehmann as Susanne
 Nedim Hazar as Hassan
 Corinna Harfouch as teacher Rathjens
 Kaya Gürel as uncle Ibrahim
 Michael Gwisdek as father Eggers

See also
 List of submissions to the 61st Academy Awards for Best Foreign Language Film
 List of German submissions for the Academy Award for Best Foreign Language Film

References

External links

1988 films
1988 romantic drama films
German romantic drama films
1980s German-language films
West German films
Turkish drama films
Films set in Hamburg
Films shot in Turkey
Films about immigration
Films about race and ethnicity
Films directed by Hark Bohm
1980s German films